Kandirpar is situated on Comilla, Bangladesh. It is considered the heart of the Comilla district.

See also 
 Comilla
 Comilla Division

References

Populated places in Cumilla District